Stig Arild Slørdahl (born 6 March 1959) is Managing Director of the Central Norway Regional Health Authority.

He has a background as a Norwegian professor of Medicine and specialist in Internal Medicine and Cardiology.
He has been dean at the Faculty of Medicine at the Norwegian University of Science and Technology (NTNU) and attending physician at St. Olavs Hospital in Trondheim.

Slørdahl's research background is in cardiac ultrasound and physical training of cardiac patients. He was chair of The Joint Committee of the Nordic Medical Research Councils (NOS-M) 2010-2012 and member of the European Medical Research Councils Core Group 2009-2012. He is now chairing the Scientific Review Group for the Biomedical Sciences in European Science Foundation and has been a member of the board of Division for Science at The Research Council of Norway. He has also been member of the board of SINTEF and The Cancer Registry of Norway.

Slørdahl has led the work to establish The Norwegian Myocardial Infarct Registry.

Selected publications

References

External links
NTNU's information on Slørdahl

1959 births
Academic staff of the Norwegian University of Science and Technology
Norwegian cardiologists
Living people
Royal Norwegian Society of Sciences and Letters
Norwegian healthcare managers
20th-century Norwegian educators
20th-century Norwegian physicians
21st-century Norwegian physicians